Adam Tanner (in Latin, Tannerus; April 14, 1572 – May 25, 1632) was an Austrian Jesuit theologian.

He was born in Innsbruck, Austria. In 1589 he joined the Society of Jesus and became a teacher. By 1603 he was invited to join the Jesuit College of Ingolstadt and take the chair of theology at the University of Ingolstadt. Fifteen years later he was given a position at the University of Vienna by the Emperor Matthias.

He was noted for his defense of the Catholic church and their practices against Lutheran reformers as well as the Utraquists. His greatest work was the Universa theologia scholastica, published in 1626–1627.

He died at the village of Unken near Salzburg, and rests in an unmarked grave. Apparently the parishioners refused to give him a Christian burial because a "hairy little imp" was found on a glass plate among his possessions.

The crater Tannerus on the Moon is named after him.

Bibliography
 Anatomiæ confessionis augustanæ, 1613, Ingolstadt.
 Astrologia sacra, 1615, Ingolstadt.
 Apologia pro Societate Iesu ex Bohemiae regno : Ab eiusdem regni statibus religionis sub utraque publico decreto immerito proscripta, 1618, Vienna.
 Universa theologia scholastica, 1627, Ingolstadt.

References
 Molitor and Erasmus, The History of the Devil: The Abolition of Witch-Prosecution

External links
 Catholic encyclopedia
 http://pluckerbooks.com/works/carusp/historydevil/chapter16.html

1572 births
1632 deaths
Austrian mathematicians
Austrian philosophers
17th-century Austrian Jesuits
Academic staff of the University of Ingolstadt
Academic staff of the University of Vienna
Jesuit scientists
16th-century Austrian Jesuits
Scientists from Innsbruck